Vincent Lamy (born July 10, 1999) is a Canadian soccer player who plays as a forward for Celtix du Haut-Richelieu.

Early life
Lamy was born in Sherbrooke, Quebec. Lamy began playing soccer in 2005 with hometown club Dynamik Sherbrooke, where he played until 2013. In 2014, he began playing for Laval-based club Les Étoiles de L'Est.

Club career

Alessandria
In 2015, Lamy signed a youth contract with Italian Serie C side Alessandria. However, due to a rule change by FIFA regarding minors playing abroad, the 16 year-old Lamy was prohibited from playing official matches for the club, but was still able to appear in friendlies while training with the academy. He spent four months with Alessandria but was eventually forced to return to Canada.

Montreal Impact
After returning to Canada, Lamy joined the academy of Major League Soccer side Montreal Impact in 2016. Lamy played two seasons of USSDA soccer with the Montreal Impact U18s and U19s, scoring six goals in seventeen appearances in his first year and 22 goals in 25 appearances in his second.

HFX Wanderers
On January 22, 2019, Lamy signed his first professional contract with Canadian Premier League side HFX Wanderers. He made his debut on May 16 in a Canadian Championship match against the Vaughan Azzurri. On April 28, 2019 he made his league debut for Halifax as a substitute in a 1–0 loss to Pacific FC. On 14 December 2019, the club announced that Lamy would not be returning for the 2020 season.

Celtix du Haut-Richelieu
In 2020, Lamy played in the Première Ligue de soccer du Québec with debutants Celtix du Haut-Richelieu during a season shortened by the COVID-19 pandemic, scoring one goal in four appearances.

International career
In 2014, Lamy participated in three Canadian under-15 identification camps, including a training camp in Costa Rica.

Career statistics

References

External links

1999 births
Living people
Association football forwards
Canadian soccer players
Soccer people from Quebec
Sportspeople from Sherbrooke
Canadian expatriate soccer players
Expatriate footballers in Italy
Canadian expatriate sportspeople in Italy
HFX Wanderers FC players
Canadian Premier League players
Première ligue de soccer du Québec players
Celtix du Haut-Richelieu players